The 2017 NCAA Division I women's volleyball tournament began November 30, 2017 and concluded on December 16 at the Sprint Center in Kansas City, Missouri. The tournament field was determined on November 26, 2017. Nebraska beat Florida in the final to claim their fifth national championship.

Qualifying teams

Bracket

Penn State Regional

Schedule

First round

Second round

Regional semifinals

Regional Final

Kentucky Regional

Schedule

First round

Second round

Regional semifinals

Regional Final

Stanford Regional

Schedule

First round

Second round

Regional semifinals

Regional Final

Florida Regional

Schedule

First round

Second round

Regional semifinals

Regional Final

Final Four

National semifinals

National Championship

Final Four All-Tournament Team

Mikaela Foecke – Nebraska (Co-Most Outstanding Player)
Kelly Hunter – Nebraska (Co-Most Outstanding Player)
Kenzie Maloney – Nebraska
Carli Snyder – Florida
Rhamat Alhassan – Florida
Merete Lutz – Stanford
Simone Lee – Penn State

Record by conference

The columns R32, S16, E8, F4, CM, and NC respectively stand for the Round of 32, Sweet Sixteen, Elite Eight, Final Four, Championship Match, and National Champion.

NCAA tournament record

There is one NCAA tournament record that was set in the 2017 tournament:

Services aces, tournament (team record) — Nebraska — 44 total aces  (9 vs. Stony Brook, 7 vs. Washington State, 9 vs. Colorado, 5 vs. Kentucky, 10 vs. Penn State, 4 vs. Florida.)

References

December 2017 sports events in the United States
 
NCAA
NCAA Women's Volleyball Championship
Sports competitions in Kansas City, Missouri